Elizabeth Anne Allen (born November 18, 1970) is a retired American actress. Allen is best known for her recurring role as the witch Amy Madison on the television series Buffy the Vampire Slayer.

Early life
Allen lived on her own after turning 16. Allen is an alumna of Gloversville High School in Gloversville, New York and graduated from Russell Sage College in Troy, New York, in 2001.

Career 
After college, Allen moved to Hollywood to begin an acting career. Since 1992, Allen has worked regularly, primarily in guest or recurring roles on various television series, including Doogie Howser, M.D. and Silk Stalkings. Allen also had a recurring role in the T.V. series Bull playing the character Pam Boyd. Her film credits have included roles in Timemaster (1995), Illegal in Blue (1995), and the controversial Silent Lies (1996).

In 2007, Allen retired from professional acting.

Buffy the Vampire Slayer 
Allen won the recurring role of Amy Madison on Buffy the Vampire Slayer for the season one episode "Witch". She returned in the second season's "Bewitched, Bothered and Bewildered", the season three episode "Gingerbread", and season four's "Something Blue", in a brief, non-speaking cameo. She returned for a three-episode guest arc in the season six episodes "Smashed", "Wrecked", and "Doublemeat Palace". She made her final appearance on Buffy in the season seven episode "The Killer in Me".

Filmography

Film

Television

External links

 
 

1970 births
Actresses from New York (state)
American television actresses
Living people
People from Gloversville, New York
Actors from Troy, New York
Russell Sage College alumni
21st-century American women